Leonid Ivanovich Abalkin (5 May 1930 – 2 May 2011) was a Russian economist.

Biography
Abalkin was born in Moscow in 1930. He was a graduate of the Plekhanov Moscow Institute of the National Economy.

He became director of the Institute of Economics of the USSR Academy of Sciences in 1986. He was a member of the Congress of People's Deputies of the Soviet Union with special responsibility for economic affairs. He later worked as an advisor to Presidents Mikhail Gorbachev and Boris Yeltsin, and was the second-in-command of Premier Nikolai Ryzhkov's government. Under Gorbachev he was one of the major advocates of rapid economic reform, with the consultancy of the Italian economist Giancarlo Pallavicini, and in 1998 became a member of the Economic Crisis Group. Since 1995 Abalkin was also a member of the New York Academy of Sciences.

Upon hearing of his death, the then Russian President Dmitry Medvedev stated:

Honours and awards
 Order of Merit for the Fatherland, 3rd class (18 November 2010) – for his significant contribution to the development of domestic science in economics and many years of fruitful activity; 4th class (5 May 2000) – for services to science and training of highly qualified personnel
 Medal of Honour (14 November 2005) – for great contribution to science and education
 Order of Friendship of Peoples
 Order of the Badge of Honour
 Laureate of the Science Support Foundation in the category "Outstanding Scientists" (2004)

References

External links 
 Abalkin's information at the Russian Academy of Sciences site

1930 births
2011 deaths
Economists from Moscow
Central Committee of the Communist Party of the Soviet Union members
People's commissars and ministers of the Soviet Union
Members of the Congress of People's Deputies of the Soviet Union
Full Members of the USSR Academy of Sciences
Full Members of the Russian Academy of Sciences
20th-century Russian economists
Recipients of the Order "For Merit to the Fatherland", 3rd class
Recipients of the Order of Honour (Russia)
Recipients of the Order of Friendship of Peoples
Burials in Troyekurovskoye Cemetery
Members of the German Academy of Sciences at Berlin
Plekhanov Russian University of Economics alumni
Soviet economists